The 2013–14 Croatian Football Cup is the twenty-third season of Croatia's football knockout competition. The defending champions are Hajduk Split, having won their sixth title the previous year by defeating Lokomotiva in the final.

Calendar

Preliminary round
The draw for the preliminary round was held on 1 August 2013 with matches scheduled on 28 August 2013.

* Match played on 27 August.

First round
First round proper consisted of 16 single-legged matches, with 16 winners of the preliminary round joined by 16 clubs with the highest cup coefficients. The draw for the first round was held on 28 August, where the club with the lowest cup coefficient hosts the one with the highest and so on. Matches were scheduled on 25 September 2013.

* Match was played on 24 September.

** Match was played on 1 October.

*** Match was played on 9 October.

Second round
The second round was contested by 16 winners from the first round in eight single-legged fixtures scheduled on 30 October 2013. It was the last stage of the competition employing the single leg format as from the quarter-finals onwards all fixtures are going to be double-legged events.

Quarter-finals
Quarter-final ties were played over two legs, scheduled for 27 November and 4 December 2013. The round featured eight winners from the second round. The unseeded draw for quarter-final pairings was held on 5 November. The tie between Rijeka and Osijek has been postponed for 2014 due to Rijeka's congested fixture list. Both clubs initially agreed to play the first leg in Rijeka on 12 February 2014 and the second leg in Osijek on 19 February 2014. However, due to the flooded pitch in Rijeka, the first leg was played on 19 February and the return leg in Osijek on 12 March.

|}

Semi-finals

First legs

Second legs

Dinamo Zagreb won 4–1 on aggregate.

Rijeka won 3–1 on aggregate.

Final

First leg

Second leg

Rijeka won 3–0 on aggregate

References

External links
Official website 

Croatian Football Cup seasons
Croatia
Croatian Cup, 2013-14